Aleksei Vyacheslavovich Martynov (born 17 July 1978) is a retired Russian professional footballer. He made his debut in the Russian Premier League in 2007 for PFC Spartak Nalchik.

External links
 

1978 births
Living people
Russian footballers
Russian expatriate footballers
Expatriate footballers in Belarus
Russian Premier League players
FC Irtysh Omsk players
FC Volgar Astrakhan players
FC Zvezda Irkutsk players
FC SKVICH Minsk players
PFC Spartak Nalchik players
FC Dynamo Bryansk players
FC Yenisey Krasnoyarsk players
FC Tyumen players
Association football forwards
FC Avangard Kursk players
FC Chita players
FC Amur Blagoveshchensk players